Loose Women (previously known as Live Talk from 2000 to 2001) is a British talk show that broadcasts on ITV weekdays from 12:30 pm to 1:30 pm. The show focuses on a panel of four female presenters who interview celebrities, talk about aspects of their lives, and discuss topical issues ranging from politics and current affairs to celebrity gossip and entertainment news. The 3,000th episode of Loose Women was broadcast on 15 May 2018.

It was originally broadcast from Norwich, then Manchester, before moving to London.

History
The panel comprises four women from various professions in the entertainment and journalism industries, who interview celebrities, discuss their lives and discuss topical issues, ranging from daily politics and current affairs, to celebrity gossip.

ITV decided to scrap the original format of "Loose Women" and instead opted for a more condensed version of the show under the new name "Live Talk". This new version was filmed in Manchester instead of London and the show kept its old roots. The rebranding made its debut on 25 September 2000 continued for 121 episodes. On 8 June 2001, Live Talk aired for the last time until 2 September 2002 when the Live Talk format and branding was scrapped and was rebranded back to Loose Women.

On 22 June 2016, Sir Cliff Richard sat down for a one-on-one interview with close friend Gloria Hunniford for a special edition of Loose Women subtitled Sir Cliff: Out of the Shadows.

On 22 March 2020, it was announced that due to the COVID-19 pandemic, production on Loose Women has been suspended until further notice. Reruns of old episodes were aired in the programme's time slot. On 28 April 2020, it was announced that Loose Women would recommence production on two live episodes per week from 4 May 2020.

On 22 October 2020, Loose Women featured an all black panel for the first time in the show's history, featuring Charlene White, Brenda Edwards, Judi Love and Kéllé Bryan. This panel has been seen several times since then.

On 19 November 2020, there was an all male panel for the first time in the show's history, to celebrate International Men's Day, altering the show's name to Loose Men for the day. Panellists featured were Marvin Humes, Iain Stirling, Ronan Keating and Roman Kemp. Since then, there have been several episodes of Loose Men featuring the likes of Vernon Kay, Richard Madeley, Johannes Radebe, Mike Tindall and Ore Oduba.

On 3 August 2022, it was announced that the live studio audience would be returning from early September, having been suspended for over two years due to the COVID-19 pandemic. The audience returned on 5 September and new opening titles were also introduced in the same episode.

Presenters
Kaye Adams and Nadia Sawalha were the original presenters on the show. Sawalha left in 2002, after the birth of her first child; Adams kept the role for the first ten series until the end of 2006, when she left to go on maternity leave. Adams, Sawalha, Jane Moore and Karren Brady were panellists for the first episode and Ruth Langsford appeared in the second episode.

Long-running panellists Carol McGiffin, Denise Welch, Jane McDonald and Lisa Maxwell departed from the programme in 2013.

Coleen Nolan, Sawalha and Moore returned as panellists during 2013, whilst Adams returned as presenter. Langsford also rejoined the programme as a presenter in 2014.

On 3 August 2016, Sherrie Hewson announced on-air that she would be leaving the show. Her final episode aired on 5 September 2016.

Denise Welch and Carol McGiffin returned to the show after 5 years away on 7 June 2018 and 5 July 2018 respectively.

On 9 May 2019, Kéllé Bryan became a panellist after appearing as a guest on 12 April 2019.

On 16 October 2019, it was confirmed that Linda Robson would return to the show after a twelve-month break due to her suffering from OCD. She returned as a panellist on 17 January 2020 after appearing as a guest on 10 January 2020.

In February 2019, Brenda Edwards made guest appearances as a panellist to fill in for Robson. She was then brought in as a regular panelist in March that year. Linda returned in early 2020 and Edwards has since stayed on making weekly appearances.

On 30 November 2020, Andrea McLean announced she was to leave the show after 13 years so she could concentrate on her new venture, membership website This Girl Is On Fire. Her last show was on 16 December 2020. On 11 January 2021, it was announced that Charlene White would become a regular anchor presenter on the show, replacing McLean after her exit from the show in December 2020.

On 3 January 2021, Saira Khan announced that she would be leaving Loose Women after 5 years with immediate effect and would not return in 2021. She made her final appearance on 15 December 2020, and was replaced by Frankie Bridge in 2021.

On 23 July 2021, it was confirmed that Sunetra Sarker and Katie Piper would become regular panellists on the show. On 7 September 2022, it was announced that Dame Kelly Holmes would join the show as a regular panellist.

Panellists

Current panel

Former regular presenters and panellists

Merchandise

Home Media
Over the course of four years, several Straight-to-DVD specials based on the series have been released by ITV Studios Home Entertainment.

 Let Loose: The Very Best of Loose Women, was released in November 2008, and was a clip show that featured highlights of Series 12 and 13.
 Late Night with the Loose Women, was released in November 2009, and featured a special extended “Late-Night” styled episode, containing more raunchier content than the main show can allow.
 Loose Women in New York: Let Loose in the City, was released on 8 November 2010. This special featured Carol McGiffin, Sherrie Hewson, Lisa Maxwell and Denise Welch going on a holiday to New York.
 Christmas with the Loose Women was released in November 2011. This one was also a special extended episode, and was presented by Andrea McLean, Carol McGiffin, Denise Welch and Lisa Maxwell.

Other
A range of books have also been published under the brand which has expanded further with an online shop selling make-up products, champagne, personalised cups and stationery.

Awards and nominations

References

External links
 
 

1999 British television series debuts
1990s British television series
2000s British television series
2010s British television series
2020s British television series
British television talk shows
English-language television shows
ITV (TV network) original programming
Television productions suspended due to the COVID-19 pandemic
Television series by ITV Studios
Television shows produced by Granada Television
Television shows produced by Anglia Television
Women's mass media